A chain pier was a type of pier. It may refer to:

Royal Suspension Chain Pier, (1823-1896), in Brighton.
Seaview Chain Pier, (1881-1952), near Ryde on the Isle of Wight.
Trinity Chain Pier, (1821-1898), near Edinburgh.